Solenopsis is a scientific name for two genera:
 Solenopsis (ant), a genus of ants
 Solenopsis (plant), a genus of flowering plants in the family Campanulaceae, commonly treated as a synonym of Laurentia or Isotoma